Atlético Clube de Ultramar, commonly known as Atlético Ultramar, is an East Timorese football club based in Manatuto, Manatuto Municipality. The team plays in the Liga Futebol Amadora. Ultramar is the only team to have ever won the Taça 12 de Novembro twice, winning the cup in both 2017 and 2018. Despite this the club has struggled in recent seasons, finishing in last place in the Primeira Divisão in 2019 and failing to qualify from the group stage in the Copa FFTL in 2020.

Squad 
As of August 2020

Coach: Francisco Araujo

Competition records

Liga Futebol Amadora

Segunda Divisão 

2016: 3rd place in Group A Segunda Divisao
2017: 1st place in Group B (Promoted)

Premier Divisão 

 2018: 3rd place
 2019: 8th place (Relegated)

Taça 12 de Novembro
2016: 1st Round
2017: Winners
2018: Winners
2019: Quarter Finals

LFA Super Taça 

 2017: Lost 4-0 to Karketu Dili
 2018: Lost 2-0 to Boavista

COPA FFTL 

 2020: 4th in Group B

Former coaches
Francisco Ribeiro

References

Football clubs in East Timor
Football